The 25th Senate of Puerto Rico is the upper house of the 17th Legislative Assembly of Puerto Rico and will meet from January 2, 2013, to January 1, 2017. All members were elected in the General Elections of 2012. The Senate has a majority of members from the Popular Democratic Party (PPD).
The body is counterparted by the 29th House of Representatives of Puerto Rico in the lower house.

Leadership

Members

Non-officers

Notes

References

25
2013 in Puerto Rico